Veterans Bridge may refer to a bridge in the United States:

 Veterans Bridge (Chesapeake, Virginia), on U.S. 17 which replaced Dominion Boulevard Steel Bridge
 Veterans Bridge (Pittsburgh), Pennsylvania, part of Interstate 579
 Veterans' Bridge (Pueblo), Colorado
 Veterans Bridge (St. Cloud, Minnesota)
 Veteran's International Bridge, in Brownsville, Texas
 Martin Luther King Bridge (St. Louis), Missouri, formerly known as the Veterans Bridge

See also 
 Veterans Memorial Bridge (disambiguation)